Vincent Rouil (born 30 October 1959 in Mont-Saint-Aignan), better known as Vincent Lagaf', is a French humorist, TV presenter, singer and actor.

Biography
In 1987, Vincent Lagaf', who had just arrived in Paris, came to national attention as a comedian when he appeared on the TV show (La Classe) aimed at discovering young comedians. With his first one-man show, Lagaf' became popular thanks to the song "Bo le lavabo", which was a success in France in 1990. A year later, he had a similar success with "La Zoubida" which was in the list of the 100 best-selling singles in France during the 1990s. (A side-scrolling platform game developed by Titus Interactive based on this song was also produced, later altered and released as Titus the Fox in other markets.) Until 1995, working with the producer Hervé Hubert, he continued to act in many sketches on stage or for television and to interpret new funny songs like Casse toi and Sweet Georgia Brown. In 1995, he played the part of Scipion in the play Le Surbook.

In 1996, for French TV channel TF1, he began hosting game shows. In 1998, he adapted Let's Make a Deal for the French audience. He hosted Le Bigdil for six years with a virtual alien called Bill and his beautiful dancing girls Les Gafettes. With this show, he became one of the most popular TV presenters, twice an award winner, and a successful TV producer. In 2000, Lagaf' and Hubert sold their companies to Endemol.

In 2006, Lagaf' stopped hosting and producing TV shows to take a sabbatical year. In 2008, he played the first leading role in the movie Le Baltringue. In 2009, after a tour with a new play Pourquoi Moi?!, he returned TV with a new version of The Price Is Right (Le Juste Prix), produced by Hubert who now works with Fremantle Media.

In 2011, he hosted the French version of the English gameshow Ant & Dec's Push the Button.

In 2016, Lagaf quit TF1.

Television
 Yakapa (January 1992 – March 1994)
 L'Or à l'appel (March 1996 – June 1997)
 Drôle de jeu (January 1997 – June 1999)
 Le Bigdil (2 February 1998 – 23 July 2004)
 Crésus (4 July 2005 – 1 September 2006)
 Le Juste Prix (July 2009 – 2015)
 Strike! (2016–present)

Discography

Albums
 Le Lavabo (1990)
 Lagaf' en chansons (1994)

Singles
 "Bo le lavabo (WC Kiss)" (1990) – FRA #1 (see List of French number-one hits of 1990)
 "La Zoubida" (1991) – FRA #1 (see List of French number-one hits of 1991)
 "Je veux des vacances" (1993) – FRA #17

Bibliography
 Éclats de rire, No. 3537 (1993), J'ai lu Ed.
 Rires à la pelle (1996), Michel Lafon Ed.
 Drôle de jeu (1999), Michel Lafon Ed.

Filmography

 1994 : Histoire de fou (short movie) by Eric Cayron – leading role
 2005 : Sous le soleil – guest star
 2002 : Les Razmoket rencontrent les Delajungle by John Eng  – dog's voice
 2010 : Le Baltringue by Cyril Sebas – leading role

Awards
 7 d'or for "Personality of the year" (1999)
 7 d'or for "Best game show" for Le Bigdil (2000)

References

External links
 All about Lagaf'
 Bigdil website
 
 Official website of Le Baltringue

People from Mont-Saint-Aignan
French television presenters
French pop singers
1959 births
Living people